The men's shot put event was part of the track and field athletics programme at the 1920 Summer Olympics. The competition was held on Tuesday, August 17, 1920, and on Wednesday, August 18, 1920. Twenty shot putters from ten nations competed. No nation had more than 4 athletes, suggesting the limit had been reduced from the 12 maximum in force in 1908 and 1912. The event was won by Ville Pörhölä of Finland, the first time the men's shot put was won by someone not from the United States. Fellow Finn Elmer Niklander took silver. The Americans, who had won all five previous editions of the shot put, including three medal sweeps, settled for bronze by Harry B. Liversedge.

Background

This was the sixth appearance of the event, which is one of 12 athletics events to have been held at every Summer Olympics. Returning throwers from the pre-war 1912 Games were gold medalist Pat McDonald of the United States, fourth-place finisher Elmer Niklander of Finland, seventh-place finisher Einar Nilsson of Sweden, twelfth-place finisher Aurelio Lenzi of Italy, and sixteenth-place finisher Raoul Paoli of France. The great Ralph Rose, who had won in 1904 and 1908 and lost narrowly to McDonald in 1912, and was still the world record holder, had died of typhoid fever at the age of 28 in 1913. This left McDonald as the "likely favorite," until he injured his hand. Ville Pörhölä of Finland, who would have been a strong challenger for a healthy McDonald, was best positioned to win after that injury.

Belgium, Estonia, Spain, and Switzerland made their debut in the men's shot put. The United States appeared for the sixth time, the only nation to have competed in all Olympic shot put competitions to date. Greece, which had appeared all five previous times, was absent for the first time.

Competition format

The competition continued to use the two-round format used in 1900 and since 1908, with results carrying over between rounds. The number of finalists expanded from three in previous Games to six in 1920. Each athlete received three throws in the qualifying round. The top six men advanced to the final, where they received an additional three throws. The best result, qualifying or final, counted.

Records

These were the standing world and Olympic records (in metres) prior to the 1920 Summer Olympics.

No new world or Olympic records were set during the competition.

Schedule

Results

The best six shot putters qualified for the final. Individual throw results for the qualifying round are not available.

References

External links
 
 

Shot put
Shot put at the Olympics